Wareham Priory was a monastery  in Dorset, England, possibly founded by the Saxons in 672 and dispersed during the Danish raids on Wareham in 876. It was refounded in 915 by Elfleda and probably dissolved in 998.

A Benedictine priory,  a dependency of Lyre Abbey in Normandy, was founded in the early 12th century on the same site. It was suppressed in 1414 as an alien priory, and granted to the Carthusians. This house was in turn seized by the Crown in 1539. The site is now occupied by The Priory Hotel which was established in the late 1970s.

References

Monasteries in Dorset
670s establishments
7th-century establishments in England
Anglo-Saxon monastic houses
Alien priories in England
Christian monasteries established in the 7th century
1539 disestablishments in England
Wareham, Dorset
7th-century church buildings in England
Benedictine monasteries in England